John Martin Law Jr. (fl.1943–1947) was mayor of Melbourne, Florida.

He was elected three times, in December 1943, December 1945 and	December 1947. He was the son of John Martin Law Sr.

References

Year of birth missing
Year of death missing
Mayors of places in Florida
People from Melbourne, Florida